The St. James' Episcopal Church in Cedartown, Georgia, at 302 and 308 West Ave., was listed on the National Register of Historic Places in 2019. The congregation was formed in 1878, and five years later began construction of its church.  It was opened for services in 1884.

References

Episcopal church buildings in Georgia (U.S. state)
National Register of Historic Places in Polk County, Georgia
Buildings and structures completed in 1884